Volda Handball (also known as Volda Handballklubb) is a handball club from Volda, Møre og Romsdal, Norway. The women's team currently compete in Eliteserien, the top division since its promotion in 2022. Volda is the first ever team from Sunnmøre to qualify for the top division.

Team

Current squad
Squad for the 2022-23 season

Goalkeeper
 1  Hilde Søyseth
 12  Ingrun Ranes
 24  Hanta Satu Hamel
Wingers
LW
 4  Kine Kvalsund (c)
 11  Ingvild Græsdal
 23  Dana Björg Gudmundsdottir
RW
 2  Auria Ann Rinono Ose
 10  Sara Hoel Røyr
 18  Rakel Sara Elvarsdottir
Line players
 3  Katrin Tinna Jensdottir
 6  Fride Heggdal Stølen
 13  Helga Pedersen Lersveen 
 30  Nora Vold Hovde

Back players
 7  Ingvild Jamtli Rye
 8  Marte Nornes
 9  Hanna Ræstad
 17  Margit Andrea Lidal
 22  Emilia Giske
 79  Iulia Andriichuk 
 88  Jelena Terzic

2023-24 transfers

Joining

Leaving
  Fride Heggdal Stølen (P) (to  Byåsen HE)

Technical staff
 Head coach: Halldór Stefán Haraldsson
 Assistant coach: Hilmar Gudlaugsson

Notable former National Team players
  Aleksandra Zimny

Notable former club players
  Ingeborg Furunes
  Lone Vik

References

External links
 Official website
 Official Topphåndball website

Norwegian handball clubs
Handball clubs established in 2005
Sport in Møre og Romsdal
2005 establishments in Norway
Volda